Fawaz Al-Qarni (born 2 April 1992) is a Saudi Arabian footballer who plays as a goalkeeper for Saudi Arabian club Al-Shabab.

Club career
Born in Jeddah, he made his debut for Al-Ittihad in a 3–0 win at home to Al Ittifaq on 6 August 2012.

On 24 July 2021, Al-Qarni joined Al-Shabab on a three-year deal.

International career
He made his debut for the Saudi Arabia national team on 9 December 2012 in a 0–0 draw with Iran.

Career statistics

Club

Honours
Al Ittihad
King Cup of Champions: 2012–13
Crown Prince Cup : 2016-17
King Cup of Champions: 2017–18

Individual
 Saudi Professional League Goalkeeper of the Month: October 2021

References

External links

Living people
1992 births
Saudi Arabian footballers
Sportspeople from Jeddah
Association football goalkeepers
Ittihad FC players
Al-Shabab FC (Riyadh) players
Saudi Professional League players
Saudi Arabia international footballers